The Bendigo International is a professional tennis tournament played on outdoor hardcourts. It is currently part of the ATP Challenger Tour and the ITF Women's World Tennis Tour, and held annually in Bendigo, Australia, since 2009.

From 2013 to 2014 there were two events in the same year, held in consecutive weeks. In 2015, one of them was replaced by the Canberra Tennis International.

In 2020, an ATP Challenger event was held in Bendigo.

Past finals

Women's singles

Men's singles

Women's doubles

Men's doubles

External links
 ITF search
 Official website

 
ITF Women's World Tennis Tour
ATP Challenger Tour
Hard court tennis tournaments
Tennis tournaments in Australia
Sport in Bendigo
Recurring sporting events established in 2009
2009 establishments in Australia
Tennis in Victoria (Australia)